The franchise Jamaica Tallawahs is the representative team of Jamaica in the Caribbean Premier League of cricket. It was one of the six teams created in 2013 for the inaugural season of the tournament. The Jamaica Tallawahs play their home games at Sabina Park in Kingston, Jamaica.

The Tallawahs won the inaugural tournament by defeating the Guyana Amazon Warriors in the final at Queen's Park Oval, they also won the 2016 CPL season. They are known for their formidable home record, winning 5 out of their 6 home games in CPL History since the end of the 2014 season. They are also the only team in CPL History to play all 11 local players in a match which they did in 2013 at home against the TT Red Steel where all 11 Tallawah players were Jamaican.

Hollywood actor Gerard Butler has an equity interest in the franchise.

Indian mobile gaming company Paytm First Games became the main sponsors for Jamaica Tallawah for the 2020 season.

Current squad
 Players with international caps are listed in bold.
As of 4 April 2022

Overall results

Season's summary 

Note:
 Abandoned matches are counted as NR (no result).
 Win or loss by super over or boundary count are counted as tied.
 Tied+Win - Counted as a win and Tied+Loss - Counted as a loss.
 NR indicates - No Result.

Administration and support staff

Statistics

Most runs 

Source: ESPNcricinfo, Last updated: 10 September 2020

Most wickets 

Source: ESPNcricinfo, Last updated: 10 September 2020

Seasons

Caribbean Premier League

The 6ixty

References 

http://www.cplt20.com/teams/jamaica-tallawahs

External links
 Jamaica on CPLT20.com
 
 

Cricket in Jamaica
Cricket teams in the West Indies
Caribbean Premier League teams
Cricket clubs established in 2013